Chickadees are a group of birds in the family Paridae.

Chickadee may also refer to:

 Chickadee (magazine), a Canadian children's magazine
 Chickadee Lake, a lake in Idaho, United States
 My Little Chickadee, a 1940 film starring W.C. Fields and Mae West
 USS Chickadee (AM-59), a minesweeper in the United States Navy

See also
 
 Chickaree